Carlos Modesto "Botong" Villaluz Francisco (November 4, 1912 – March 31, 1969) was a Filipino muralist from Angono, Rizal.

Early life
Francisco was a most distinguished practitioner of mural painting for many decades and best known for his historical pieces. He was one of the first Filipino  modernists along with Galo Ocampo and Victorio C. Edades who broke away from Fernando Amorsolo's romanticism of Philippine scenes. According to restorer Helmuth Josef Zotter, Francisco's art "is a prime example of linear painting where lines and contours appear like cutouts."

Later career
Francisco served as the production designer for the 1961 film adaptation of José Rizal's Noli Me Tángere.

He was responsible for the discovery of the now famous Angono Petroglyphs in 1965. He was also involved in Costume Design in Philippine cinema.

His great works include portrayals of the Blood Compact, First Mass at Limasawa, The Martyrdom of Rizal, Bayanihan, Magpupukot, Fiesta, Bayanihan sa Bukid, Sandugo, Portrait of Purita, The Invasion of Limahong, Serenade, and Muslim Betrothal.  Some of his murals have suffered big damage over the years. The "Pageant of Commerce" emerged from several years of restoration in 2000.

His murals, The Progress of Medicine in the Philippines,  was restored for the 3rd time in 2007 and is currently residing in the National Art Gallery of the Philippines. A high-quality replica of the mural is also located at its previous location at the lobby of the Philippine General Hospital.

Francisco's last work is the Camote Diggers which was left unfinished.

Death
Botong died on March 31, 1969, in Angono, Rizal, Philippines.

Gallery

References

1912 births
1969 deaths
20th-century Filipino painters
Burials at the Libingan ng mga Bayani
Artists from Rizal
Filipino portrait painters
Modern artists
Muralists
National Artists of the Philippines